Albert Kuvodu also known as Daavi Oo Daavi or Daavi is a Ghanaian actor and producer.

Filmography 
List of films he has acted over the years.

 Fresh Trouble
 Fon Shop
 Scent of Danger
 Ama
 Sun City
 Thursday Theatre
 Hard Times
 Dark Sand 
 That Day
 London Get Problem
 After the Promise

Podcasts 
In 2020, Kuvodu starred in the scripted comedy-fiction podcast DEM TIMES, voicing multiple roles including Mr Adjei, the father to the lead character Samuel Adjei.

References 

Living people
21st-century Ghanaian male actors
Year of birth missing (living people)